The Dormition Church is an Orthodox church in the village Sopik near Gjirokastër, Albania, dedicated to the Dormition of the Theotokos. It is a Cultural Monument of Albania since 1963.

References

Cultural Monuments of Albania
Buildings and structures in Dropull